East Rocky Hill is an unincorporated community and census-designated place (CDP) located in Franklin Township, in Somerset County, New Jersey, United States. As of the 2010 United States Census, the CDP's population was 469.

Geography
According to the United States Census Bureau, East Rocky Hill had a total area of 4.252 square miles (11.014 km2), including 4.165 square miles (10.788 km2) of land and 0.087 square miles (0.226 km2) of water (2.05%).

Demographics

Census 2010

References

Census-designated places in Somerset County, New Jersey
Franklin Township, Somerset County, New Jersey